The Society for Family Health (SFH) is a pan-African non governmental organisation (NGO), founded in 1983 and incorporated in 1985.

The organisation was founded by three Nigerians, Professor Olikoye Ransome-Kuti, Mallam Dahiru Wali, and Hon. Justice Ifeyinwa Nzeako.

SFH's intervention areas include; Treating and positively changing behaviour towards malaria prevention and treatment with the use of rapid diagnostic test or microscopy, HIV/TB treatment and prevention (including prevention of mother-to-child transmission), adolescent and young people programming, reproductive health and family planning (RH/FP), health policy and financing, Pharma systems strengthening, research and management information systems, cervical cancer screening and prevention, and safe water systems. Dr Omokhudu Idogho is currently the managing director of the organisation.

History 

SFH is a pan- African non-governmental organisation founded in 1983 by Honourable Justice Ifeyinwa Nzeako, Prof. Olikoye Ransome-Kuti, Pharm (Mallam) Dahiru Wali and Mr Phil Harvey. SFH began as a Population Services International (PSI) affiliate with one HIV grant and reproductive health products for distribution in Nigeria.

In 1985, SFH was incorporated as a Nigerian non-governmental organisation and in 1994 released the "Who Get This Rain Coat" Gold Circle Condom/Family Planning campaign on national television. In the late 1980s, it went into partnerships with pharmaceutical companies to distribute Gold Circle condoms in Lagos, Oyo, and Ogun States, in South Western Nigeria. It soon scaled up its operations, expanding nationwide, and commencing the marketing of oral contraceptives, in partnership with USAID. A partnership with the then UK's Department for International Development (DFID) (now the Foreign, Commonwealth and Development Office) followed which also focused on the marketing of condoms, oral and injectable contraceptives, and a water-based lubricant.

By 1997, SFH was distributing seventeen million condoms annually, and by 2009, 200 million condoms all over Nigeria at a subsidised price. In 2003, SFH launched its malaria programme, in partnership with USAID. The focus was on the treatment and prevention of malaria - one of the biggest causes of infant and child mortality in Nigeria. The malaria programme has grown significantly, with funding and support from The Global Fund to Fight AIDS, Tuberculosis and Malaria. Currently, the focus is on the use of Artemisinin-based Combination Therapies (ACT) and conducting Rapid Diagnostic Test for malaria before treatment as well as encouraging proper use of Long-Lasting Insecticidal Nets.

In 2005, SFH became the first Nigerian organisation to receive direct funding from the United States Agency for International Development (USAID) to implement programmes in reproductive health. SFH is operating in four West African Countries - Liberia, Ghana, Sierra Leone, and Nigeria. They have 20 regional offices and 19 active projects present across all 36 states in Nigeria including the Federal Capital Territory where the organisation is headquartered.

The Society for Family Health ensures healthy pregnancies, safe deliveries, child spacing, and emergency interventions for women at risk. The organisation receives its funding support from a number of national and international donors. Among these are: The World Bank, Bill & Melinda Gates Foundation, The Children's Investment Fund Foundation, MSD for Mothers, the United States International Development Agency, Stop TB partnership, the Foreign, Commonwealth and Development Office, Oxfam Novib, United Nations Population Fund, and The Global Fund to Fight AIDS, Tuberculosis and Malaria.

Board of Trustees 
SFH Nigeria's board of trustees are as follows;

 Prof. Ekanem Ikpi Braide - President, Board of Trustees, Society for Family Health, Nigeria
 Pharm. Ahmed I. Yakasai - Former president, Pharmaceutical Society of Nigeria
 Professor Joy Ngozi Ezeilo - Founder of WACOL
 Sir Bright Ekweremadu - Country Director, CBM International
 Pharm. Remi Adeseun - Director, Africa at Salient Advisory
 Dr Chikwe Ihekweazu -  Assistant Director-General for Health Emergency Intelligence, World Health Organisation
 Kim Schwartz- Senior Vice President and Chief Financial Officer, Population Services International (PSI)
 Dr Goodluck Obi, FCA- Partner & Head, Consumer and Industrial Markets at KPMG
 Abasi Ene-Obong, PhD - Founder and CEO of 54gene

Operations and locations 
The Society for Family Health (SFH) operates in four West African countries: Sierra Leone, Ghana, Liberia, and Nigeria. In Nigeria, SFH has 20 regional offices and 19 active projects are present across all 36 states in Nigeria including the FCT- Abuja where the organisation is headquartered.

The Society for Family Health works in six thematic areas affecting family health in Nigeria. The thematic areas are: Safe Water Systems in Nigeria, Family Planning and Reproductive Health, Maternal and Child Healthcare, HIV/AIDS Prevention and Treatment, Malaria Prevention and Treatment, & Health and Social Systems Strengthening.

SFH Nigeria's public health interventions in these thematic areas are implemented through different projects across several states across Nigeria. SFH creates demand for life-saving health commodities through social marketing. The commodities are stored at a 7,400 square meters SFH Warehouse in Ota, Ogun State. and are also packaged, and distributed all over West Africa. The organisation has a condom testing lab where male condoms are tested prior to packaging and distribution.

Publications

References

External links 
 

Organizations established in 1983
Malaria organizations
Medical and health organizations based in Nigeria
Family planning in Nigeria
Cancer in Nigeria